The Women's Republican Council (WRC) is a women's NGO in Armenia. There are 83 community chapters in Armenia. The Chairwomen for the organization is Nora Hakopyan.

History
Though initially implemented as a conference in 1987 and again in 1991, the organization became first established when it was registered with the Ministry of Justice (Armenia) in 1992. In 1995, WRC, with the help of UNDP assistance, began participating in international conferences on Women's rights including the International Beijing Conference

Partners
WRC lists the following partners:

UNDP
UNICEF
UNFPA
WFP
Eurasia Foundation
International Foundation for Electoral Systems
USAID
Marmacash
Oxfam
AED
Equality Now
NDI
IWRAW
WEDO

References

External links
WRC Website

Women's organizations based in Armenia
Politics of Armenia
Women's rights in Armenia